Laser Design Inc. is a company headquartered in Minneapolis, MN that designs, manufactures, and sells 3D laser scanners, used to digitally capture the shape of physical objects such as free-form surfaces and complex part geometries.

Laser Design has been a supplier of high precision 3D scanner and 3D laser scanning services since 1987.  The company’s patented line-sensor technology reduces scanning time by collecting data quickly.  Surveyor 3D laser digitizing systems quickly and accurately measure parts of all sizes, especially those with complex geometry. Rapid inspection and verification applications, including process control and in-line inspection, reverse engineering, rapid prototyping, promise to be a major consumer of laser scanning systems in the future.

Laser Design received the Inc. 500 Fastest Growing Company awards in 2007  and also operates GKS Inspection Services, an in-house service bureau division offering 3D scanning, reverse engineering, and dimensional inspection services.  GKS also provides terrestrial scanning services for digitizing large objects, for example bridges, buildings, power plants, mines, and ships.

GKS Inspection Services' Michigan facility is accredited by the American Association for Laboratory Accreditation in Mechanical Testing and Calibration (ISO/IEC 17025).

References 
 Getting Its Head Out of the Point Cloud 
 Bob Cramblitt, Mold Development with Digital Shape Sampling and Processing
 Kristine Spangard Interference problems solved, two parts can now work together

External links 
 Official Laser Design, Inc. website

Manufacturing companies based in Minneapolis
3D imaging
Laser companies